Black Butterfly is the second album by American singer Dana Dawson, originally released in 1995. It includes Dawson's biggest hit single "3 Is Family", which charted in Australia and several European countries, including reaching number 9 in the United Kingdom. Two further singles from the album reached the top 30 of the UK Singles Chart: "Got to Give Me Love", which reached number 27, and "Show Me", which reached number 28, plus another single which was later added to a re-issue of the album, "How I Wanna Be Loved", which reached number 42.

Black Butterfly was Dawson's final studio album release before her death in 2010.

Track listing

Note
 Track 9 was added to the 1996 re-issue of the album.

References

External links
Black Butterfly at Discogs

1995 albums
EMI Records albums
Albums produced by Ric Wake
Albums produced by Narada Michael Walden